ARW may refer to:
 American Revolutionary War
 Arad International Airport, Romania (IATA code: ARW)
 Arawak language of South America (ISO 639-2 and ISO 639-3 codes: arw)
 Army Ranger Wing, the special forces of the Irish military 
 ARW, a raw image format used by Sony
 An Air Refueling Wing of the US Air Force 
 Yes Featuring Jon Anderson, Trevor Rabin, Rick Wakeman, also abbreviated ARW